Francis, Frances or Frank Grant may refer to:

Sir Francis Grant, Lord Cullen (1658/1663–1726), Scottish judge
Sir Francis Grant (artist) (1803–1878), Scottish artist
Sir Francis James Grant (1863–1953), Scottish Officer of Arms
Francis Chapman Grant (1823–1894), merchant-prince in the Gold Coast
Francis William Grant, British Member of Parliament for Inverness-shire
Frances Grant (1909–1982), American actress and dancer
Frank Grant (baseball) (1865–1937), baseball player
Frank Grant (American football) (born 1950), former American football wide receiver
Frank Grant (boxer) (born 1965), British boxer